Trans-Texas may refer to:

 Trans-Texas Corridor (TTC), a transportation network in the planning and early construction stages in the U.S. state of Texas
 Trans-Texas Airways, a former a United States airline, known as Texas International from 1969